Abbasabad (also Romanized as ‘Abbāsābād; also known as Borzābād) is a village in Safiabad Rural District, Bam and Safiabad District, Esfarayen County, North Khorasan Province, Iran. At the 2006 census, its population was 279, in 75 families.

References 

Populated places in Esfarayen County